Lotus is the fourth album by Swedish progressive metal band Soen. It was released on 1 February 2019 via Silver Lining Music. It was produced by David Castillo and Iñaki Marconi, and preceded by the singles "Martyrs" on 7 December 2018, and the title track on 18 January 2019.

It is the first album with Canadian musician Cody Ford on guitar.

Track listing
All songs are written by Soen.

Personnel
Joel Ekelöf – vocals
Martin Lopez – drums
Lars Åhlund – keyboards, guitar
Stefan Stenberg – bass
Cody Ford – lead guitar

Additional personnel
Emeli Jeremias – cello
David Castillo – producing, mixing
Iñaki Marconi – producing, band photo
Jens Bogren – mastering
Wriliya – cover artwork
Enrique Zabala – album design
Stephanie Pearl – booklet images

Charts

References

2019 albums
Soen albums